Paul Ireland (born 1970) is a Scottish actor from Ardrossan, North Ayrshire, Scotland. He is best known for his role as Superintendent Duncan Hayes in Neighbours.

Career 
Ireland originally started off as a fishmonger in his father's shop in Greenock, Renfrewshire for five years before deciding to learn acting. In 1995, Ireland acted in the West End of London at the Ambassadors Theatre in a theatrical adaptation of the novel Trainspotting. During its run, the show won the Sunday Times Best New Play award.

During his career, Ireland has acted in numerous British television programmes such as Judge John Deed, Two Thousand Acres of Sky, The Bill and Midsomer Murders. In April 2011, he gained a role in Australian soap opera, Neighbours as Superintendent Duncan Hayes. Ireland was initially cast to play the role for thirteen episodes. Ireland made his debut in Neighbours in Episode 6183. In 2012, he also acted in Australian Broadcasting Corporation comedy, Outland after auditioning and meeting the writers, who told him that they wanted a British actor in the role in the programme. In 2013, Ireland made a return appearance on Neighbours as Duncan Hayes. 
 
In 2006, Ireland appeared in the BBC History online interactive game CDX as MacKinnon, a Mithraist soldier.

In 2016, he co-produced and directed the Australian drama film Pawno.

Since 2018, Ireland appeared in the Australian AFL drama Playing for Keeps as Andrew Macleish, president of the Southern Jets football club.

Personal life 
Ireland is married to casting director Thea McLeod, with whom he has one son, actor Finn Ireland. He also has a daughter, Georgia Blue Ireland from his first marriage. After leaving Scotland, he moved to London for thirteen years before leaving the United Kingdom for Australia in 2009, where he currently resides.

Filmography 
 Pawno (2016)
 Christ the Lord (2016)
 The King's Daughter (2022)

References

External links 

Living people
1970 births
Scottish male soap opera actors
Scottish male television actors
Scottish male stage actors
Scottish male video game actors
Scottish expatriates in Australia